Patricia Glinton-Meicholas (born 1950) is a Bahamian writer, cultural critic, historian and educator.

Biography
She was born on Cat Island, Bahamas, and was educated at the University of the West Indies and the University of Miami. She was employed as an administrator at the College of the Bahamas, where she has also been a lecturer and academic dean. The College presented her with a Lifetime Achievement Award for culture and literature in 2014.

She was the first woman to present the Sir Lynden Pindling Memorial Lecture, the first winner of the Bahamas Cacique Award for Writing and, in 1998, received the Silver Jubilee of Independence Medal for Literature. Her poetry has appeared in various journals and she is included in the Anthology of Caribbean Poetry published by the Government of Guyana. Her poetry collection Chasing Light was a finalist in the 2012 International Proverse Prize Competition sponsored by Proverse Publishing Hong Kong.

She co-founded the Bahamas Association for Cultural Studies and has edited its journal Yinna. She has written and directed six television historical documentaries for the Bahamas National Trust. She has written several academic papers and published a monograph on Bahamian folktales.

Glinton-Meicholas is married to Neko Meicholas and has one son.

Selected works
Some of Patricia Glinton-Meicholas' works are: 

 An Evening in Guanima, collected folktales (1993)
 A Shift in the Light, novel
 No Vacancy in Paradise, collected poems
 Robin’s Song, collected poems (2001)
 Chasing Light, collected poems (Proverse Hong Kong, 2013). Proverse Prize Finalist 2012.
 Years of Favour, history of the Roman Catholic Archdiocese of The Bahamas, with photographs by Neko Meicholas and Carla Glinton
 Bahamian Art 1492 to 1992, history, with Huggins and Smith
 Talkin' Bahamian
 More Talkin' Bahamian
 How To Be a True-True Bahamian
 How to Be a True-True Bahamian 2
 The Sinking of HMBS Flamingo and Its Roots in United States, Cuba and Bahamas Relationships

References

External links
 Patricia Glinton-Meicholas website.
 "Patricia Glinton-Meicholas - Boxed in-Reflections of Bahamian Issues". The College of The Bahamas and The NAGB Talks.

1950 births
Bahamian poets
Bahamian women writers
Bahamian women poets
Living people
University of the West Indies alumni
University of Miami alumni
20th-century women writers
20th-century Bahamian people
21st-century women writers
People from Cat Island, Bahamas
Bahamian educators
Bahamian novelists
21st-century Bahamian people
Academic staff of the University of the Bahamas